William Rice (August 17, 1931 – January 23, 2006) was an American actor, artist, and member of the no wave avant-garde art scene in Manhattan's East Village for many years.

Early life and education 
He was born in Vermont and graduated from Middlebury College.

Career 
After graduating from Middlebury, Rice moved into an apartment on Third Avenue in Manhattan in 1953. A painter, film actor, and an unaffiliated scholar, Bill Rice was one of the central figures in the various bohemian enclaves that gathered and overlapped in the Lower East Side of the 1960s. Among his diverse achievements, Rice worked with noted Gertrude Stein expert Ulla Dydo on Gertrude Stein: The Language That Rises: 1923–1934 (2003), an essential study of the author's writing process, using her notebooks and manuscripts.

Death 
Rice died in Manhattan of lung cancer on January 23, 2006.

Filmography

Film

Television

Works
 by Bill Rice, Evocation I and Evocation II, BOMB Magazine (Fall, 1984)
 by Bill Rice, Travel Sketchbook and Hamburg, 1982, BOMB Magazine (Winter, 1983)

References

External links
 
 "Art in Review, Bill Rice" by Holland Cotter of the New York Times

1931 births
2006 deaths
Deaths from lung cancer in New York (state)
Middlebury College alumni
People from the Lower East Side
Painters from Vermont
Male actors from Vermont
20th-century American male actors
21st-century American male actors
American male film actors
Painters from New York (state)
20th-century American painters
20th-century American male artists
American male painters